The 2012 UCI Europe Tour was the eighth season of the UCI Europe Tour. The 2012 season began on 29 January 2012 with the Grand Prix d'Ouverture La Marseillaise and ended on 21 October 2012 with the Chrono des Nations.

The points leader, based on the cumulative results of previous races, wears the UCI Europe Tour cycling jersey. Giovanni Visconti of Italy was the defending champion of the 2010–11 UCI Europe Tour. John Degenkolb of Germany was crowned as the 2012 UCI Europe Tour.

Throughout the season, points are awarded to the top finishers of stages within stage races and the final general classification standings of each of the stages races and one-day events. The quality and complexity of a race also determines how many points are awarded to the top finishers, the higher the UCI rating of a race, the more points are awarded.

The UCI ratings from highest to lowest are as follows:
 Multi-day events: 2.HC, 2.1 and 2.2
 One-day events: 1.HC, 1.1 and 1.2

Events

Final standings
There is a competition for the rider, team and country with the most points gained from winning or achieving a high place in the above races.

Individual classification

Team classification

Nation classification

Nation under-23 classification

Footnotes

References

External links
 

 
UCI Europe Tour

UCI